Roestes is a genus of dogtooth characins from tropical South America, where found in the Amazon Basin and various rivers in the Guianas.  There are three described species in this genus.

Species
 Roestes itupiranga Menezes & C. A. S. de Lucena, 1998
 Roestes molossus (Kner, 1858)
 Roestes ogilviei (Fowler, 1914)

References
 

Cynodontidae
Fish of South America
Taxa named by Albert Günther